Neuss Süd is a railway station situated in Neuss in western Germany. It is served by the S11 line of the Rhine-Ruhr S-Bahn at 20-minute intervals from Monday to Friday and at 30-minute intervals on the weekend.

References 

Rhine-Ruhr S-Bahn stations
S11 (Rhine-Ruhr S-Bahn)
Neuss
Buildings and structures in Rhein-Kreis Neuss
Railway stations in Germany opened in 1989